Runcorn East railway station serves the eastern suburbs of Runcorn in Cheshire, England, offering train services to Warrington and Manchester and to Chester and North Wales.

History
The station opened by British Rail on 3 October 1983  to serve the new suburbs of Runcorn New Town. It is situated a short distance from the site of the former Norton station (closed by the British Transport Commission in 1952) and the nearby signal box still bears this name.

The station was formally adopted by the North Cheshire Rail Users group on 16 May 2008, under the Arriva Trains Wales Adopt a Station Initiative.

Facilities
Arriva began looking into the possibility of installing scrolling information screens on the platforms, with train running information in 2008. An initial site survey was carried out on 30 May 2008 with a follow up on 20 September 2008. A third site survey was carried out in January 2010; this also included a PA system being installed, looking at improving CCTV coverage over the station and improvements for disabled access to the station. On 17 January 2011 site work started on the installation of information screens on both platforms - these are now completed and operational (as of May 2011).

The station has a staffed ticket office - this is staffed six days per week (not Sundays) from the start of the morning peak until early afternoon.  At other times tickets can be purchased from self-service ticket machines (card payments only) available on both platforms.  Waiting shelters and bench seating is provided at platform level.   Step-free access to both platforms is via ramps from the footbridge that links the ticket office and car park.

Services
Runcorn East is served by an hourly Transport for Wales service to Manchester Piccadilly via Warrington Bank Quay. Many of these are extended through to  outside of weekday peak periods.

In the other direction, services run to Chester, with most trains continuing along the North Wales Coast Line to Llandudno (services terminate at Chester in the late evening & on Sundays). The  Sutton tunnel is just west of the station.

Public transport interchange
Bus services operate from the station to Runcorn Old Town via Halton Lea, and to Widnes. The station is also connected by an Arriva North West bus service to the main Runcorn railway station (operated by Avanti West Coast), which has services to London Euston, Birmingham New Street, Crewe and Liverpool via the West Coast Main Line.

References

Bibliography

External links

Runcorn
Railway stations in the Borough of Halton
 DfT Category E stations
Railway stations opened by British Rail
Railway stations in Great Britain opened in 1983
Northern franchise railway stations
Railway stations served by Transport for Wales Rail